KVN (an abbreviation of , Klub Vesyólykh i Nakhódchivykh or Ka-Ve-En, "Club of the Funny and Inventive") is a Russian and formerly Soviet Union comedy television show and international competition in which teams—usually composed of college students—compete by giving humorous answers and show prepared sketches. The show originated in the Soviet Union and is based on the earlier program An Evening of Funny Questions. The program was first aired on the First Soviet Channel on November 8, 1961.

In 1972, Soviet censors who found the students' impromptu jokes offensive and anti-Soviet, banned KVN. The show was revived in 1986 during the perestroika era, with Alexander Maslyakov as its host. It is one of the longest-running  programs on Russian television; its anniversary on 8 November is celebrated by KVN players every year since its inception and was widely celebrated for the first time in 2001.

During the perestroika era ( 1985-1991), KVN spread to Russian expatriate communities. In 1992, an Israeli team played against the Commonwealth of Independent States (CIS) team. The game became a success, and more international gamesl followed: the CIS team visited Israel, Germany and the United States. In 1994, the first KVN World Festival was held in Israel; it featured four teams representing the United States, Israel, the CIS and Germany.

Leagues and competitions

Groups of KVN teams were organized into several leagues, in which they annually competed for the League Champion title. To organize the movement, the KVN Union created a structure of regional and multi-regional arrangements of Leagues. The Major League and the Premier League are regularly broadcast on Russian television station Channel One. Other leagues were broadcast on local channels. The winner of the Major League (Vysshaya Liga ) is declared the Champion of the Club. There are other KVN competitions outside the leagues: the KVN Festival (KiViN) is held in Sochi each January and attracts hundreds of teams from around the world: this is where teams are arranged into leagues for the season; the Musical Festival, which is called "Singing KiViN" (Golosyaschiy KiViN), was held every July in Jūrmala, Latvia; and has been held in Svetlogorsk, Kaliningrad Oblast, Russia, since 2005. At the festival, teams compete to win prestigious prizes; the Summer Cup or Supercup is usually played in August every year, usually in Sochi, and only Major League champions are allowed to compete (with some exceptions: in 2003, when a team of famous KVN players competed, and in 2007, 2008 and 2010, when finalists were invited). A game called the Specproject (pronounced "Spetsproyekt") is held every November to celebrate KVN anniversary. Many places, both inside and outside the CIS, have leagues independent from the KVN Union and hold their own competitions.

Format

KVN is a task-based team competition that is played in front of a live audience and a panel of judges. Typically, each team is asked to complete four or five themed assignments, such as:
 Mandatory
Greeting (Privetstviye): witty introduction of the team, humorous greeting to the jury and spectators.
Warm-up (Razminka) is usually the second contest; a rapid exchange of funny questions and improvised answers, sometimes played against the audience, jury and the host.
Musical Competition (Muzykalnyy Konkurs): the competing teams perform musical sketches, sing, play musical instruments and dance. Sometimes an alternative, shorter version called One Song-Contest (Konkurs Odnoy Pesni) is played; players must use one melody throughout the competition.
 Optional
STEM ("students' variety miniature theater"): three performers from a team are allowed to be on stage simultaneously.
Captains' contest (Kapitanskiy Konkurs): individual competition between the team captains.
Homework (Domashneye Zadaniye): comedy sketches on a given topic; sometimes Musical Homework is played when there is no Musical Competition.
BRIZ (Bureau of Rationalization and Invention): teams present an invention, a brief historical survey, movies, photo-albums or any type of new idea. It is also called a literature contest because it mainly consists of textual jokes.
News Contest (Konkurs Novostey): similar to the BRIZ but focuses on strange and funny news items.
Biathlon: a representative of each team "shoots" one or more jokes at the audience. The jury decides who leaves the "shooting range" until only two contestants remain and the jury chooses one winner who gets one point. In case of a draw the finalists receive 0.9 points each.
Freestyle: a more-modern and freer version of the Greeting, in which the teams have no genre restrictions.
Cinema Contest (Kinokonkurs) involves contestants making a movie, a music video, a clip consisting of different video and audio pieces, or dubbing a well-known movie.

A panel of celebrity judges evaluates performances on wit, humor, production values and audience reaction, and declares a winner by awarding points to the teams. In the Premier League, the jury usually consists of famous KVN players.

Popularity

According to the official website of KVN Union, the game has over five million live viewers annually; more than 40,000 participants organized into more than 3,000 regularly competing teams from more than 100 cities.

For more than 20 years, television broadcasts of KVN games received the highest ratings in Russia. The game is so popular politicians use it as an opportunity to gain extra points: Boris Yeltsin, Vladimir Putin and Dmitry Medvedev attended games played before elections. The game of KVN helps in interstate relationships; the CIS–Israel game broadcast on September 19, 1992, helped improve relationships between the two countries—mostly on Russia's side. KVN became part of the culture and became a game of choice in Russian-speaking communities worldwide.

In 2006, the president of the club Alexander Maslyakov received one of the highest awards from Vladimir Putin, the President of Russia, for hosting the game for so many decades, at the end of the game dedicated to KVN's 45th anniversary.

International reach

Since perestroika opened Soviet borders for emigrants, KVN has reached Israel, Germany, Australia, Portugal, France, the United Kingdom, Vietnam and the United States. Many countries created their own teams, leagues and competitions. In 1992, the Israel team played against the CIS team. The game was a success and more international games followed; the CIS team visited Israel, Germany and the United States. In 1994, the first KVN World Festival was held in Israel with four teams from the United States, Israel, the CIS and Germany. This event attracted a new generation of players. Currently, the American league includes more than 30 teams from universities, including  Harvard, Berkeley and New York University (NYU), the first League Champion. KVN Israel comprises two leagues with about 30 teams. The UK also has a prominent KVN community, with teams from a number of universities.

Notable KVN players

Yuli Gusman, captain of the Guys from Baku team (1967—1971, Major League) and a long-time jury member (since 1986).
Gennady Zyuganov, captain of the Physics and Mathematics Faculty team of the Oryol State University (1960s).
Leonid Yakubovich, Gennady Khazanov and Vladimir Semago, members of the MISI team (1960s, Major League) and jury.
Mikhail Zadornov, captain of the Riga Technical University team (1970s), guest star (2013, Major League). Jury member.
Mikhail Yevdokimov, captain of the Novosibirsk Trade University team (1979—1981).
Valdis Pelšs, Alexei Kortnev and Neschastny Sluchai, members of the MSU team (1987—1988, Major League) and jury.
Leonid Slutsky, The Third Sons team of FC Olimpia Volgograd (1990s), guest star (2013 and 2014, Major League). Jury.
Volodymyr Zelensky, President of Ukraine (2019–present), captain of Kvartal 95, Kryvyi Rih (1998–2003, Major League).
Elchin Azizov, Anar Mammadkhanov and Bahram Bagirzade, members of the Parni iz Baku team (1991—2001, Major League).
Pelageya, member of the NGU team (1997, Major League), the youngest KVN player of her time. Jury member.
Grigori Gorin and Arkady Arkanov, wrote for the Sechenov University team (1960s). Jury members.
Vadim Samoylov of the Agatha Christie rock band, member of the UPI team (1987—1988, Major League).
Aleksandr Filippenko, member of the Moscow Institute of Physics and Technology team (1962/1963 champions).
Garik Martirosyan and Artur Janibekyan, members of the New Armenians team (1993—2002, Major League).
Sergei Svetlakov, member of the Ural pelmeni team (2000—2009, Major League).
Petr Elfimov, member of the BSU and RUDN teams (1999—2003, Major League).
Sergey Lazarev, captain of the school KVN team (revealed it during one of the games while serving as a jury member).
Dmitry Koldun, member of the RSMU team Storm Warning (2005, Euroleague, Premier-League). Also a jury member.
Sitora Farmonova, member of the Asia MIX team (2015—2016, Major League).
Yolka, member of the united Uzhhorod-Vinnytsia team (2001—2003).
Ruben Jaghinyan, member of the Yerevan State Medical University team (1991—1994, Major League).
Mikhail Galustyan, member and captain of the Burnt by the Sun team (1999—2003, Major League). Jury member.
Semyon Slepakov, captain of the United Pyatigorsk team (2000—2006, Major League). Jury member.
Yelena Khanga, member of the World United team (1980s).
Anatoly Wasserman, member of the Odessa team (1970s), jury member.
Verka Serduchka, captain of the CPTU No.30 team, a famous singer, comedian and dancer that won second place representing Ukraine in the Eurovision Song Contest 2007

References

External links

some KVN flyers 
 
 KVN Western Europe
 KVN Germany 
 KVN Israel
 Bearfoot.KVN - All about KVN in Lithuania!
 American KVN League

 
Russian comedy television series
1961 Russian television series debuts
1970s Soviet television series
1980s Soviet television series
1990s Russian television series
2000s Russian television series
2010s Russian television series
2020s Russian television series
Russian game shows
1960s Soviet television series
Soviet television shows